Kaarel Kiidron (born 30 April 1990) is a retired Estonian footballer who last played in Estonia for JK Tammeka Tartu, as a defender.

Career
Kaarel Kiidron began his career with FC Lootos Põlva.

In 2007, he moved to JK Tammeka Tartu. He rose through the youth ranks, and made his Meistriliiga debut on 14 April 2009.

He was loaned to Viktoria Žižkov in 2012. At the end of the season he signed a two-year contract with the club.

On January 17, 2014, he terminated the contract with Viktoria Žižkov on a mutual consent.

In the middle of February 2014, he took up the position of first team manager in his first pro-team Tammeka. He is also registered as a player in the Tammeka first team, being able to play in the Meistriliiga, when called upon.

International career
On 23 May 2012, Kiidron was added to the squad to face Croatia after Alo Bärengrub's injury.  The player was surprisingly in Tarmo Rüütli's starting eleven, gaining his first cap for Estonia.

References

External links

1990 births
Living people
People from Antsla Parish
Estonian footballers
Estonia international footballers
Estonian expatriate footballers
Expatriate footballers in the Czech Republic
Estonian expatriate sportspeople in the Czech Republic
Tartu JK Tammeka players
Meistriliiga players
Czech First League players
FK Viktoria Žižkov players
Association football defenders